Choi Jeong-hyeok (born 1940) is a South Korean wrestler. He competed in the men's freestyle 63 kg at the 1968 Summer Olympics.

References

External links
 

1940 births
Living people
South Korean male sport wrestlers
Olympic wrestlers of South Korea
Wrestlers at the 1968 Summer Olympics
People from Imsil County
Sportspeople from North Jeolla Province
20th-century South Korean people